Koro Issa Ahmed Koné (born 5 July 1989), known as Koro Koné, is an Ivorian footballer who plays as a forward for Swiss club Yverdon.

Career
He came to Spartak Trnava from Hertha BSC II in March 2009. Previously, he played for youth teams of CFDF Seni Fofana, Jomo Cosmos, Grasshoppers Zürich and MSV Duisburg.
In July 2015, he signed a contract with the Algerian club CS Constantine for 2 years.

International career
Koné played for the Ivory Coast national under-20 football team and played for the U-17 the CAN 2005.

Career statistics

References

External links

1989 births
Living people
Ivorian footballers
Ivorian expatriate footballers
FC Spartak Trnava players
Hertha BSC II players
Dijon FCO players
AC Arlésien players
CS Constantine players
CS Sedan Ardennes players
US Boulogne players
Servette FC players
Yverdon-Sport FC players
Slovak Super Liga players
Ligue 1 players
Ligue 2 players
Championnat National players
Algerian Ligue Professionnelle 1 players
Swiss Super League players
Swiss Challenge League players
Expatriate footballers in Slovakia
Expatriate footballers in Germany
Expatriate footballers in France
Expatriate footballers in Algeria
Expatriate footballers in Switzerland
Ivorian expatriate sportspeople in Slovakia
Ivorian expatriate sportspeople in Germany
Ivorian expatriate sportspeople in France
Ivorian expatriate sportspeople in Algeria
Ivorian expatriate sportspeople in Switzerland
Ivory Coast under-20 international footballers
Footballers from Abidjan
Association football wingers
Association football forwards